Simon Kempston is a Scottish singer-songwriter and acoustic guitarist from Dundee, Scotland.

Career
Simon Kempston is now based in Edinburgh. The Herald has referred to him as 'one of Scotland's very best singer-songwriters'.

He has released fifteen albums and one EP, ten of which have been engineered and co-produced by Scottish folk musician Ian McCalman of  This discography consists of nine song-based albums, one song-based EP, four instrumental acoustic guitar albums and two alt-blues albums under the pseudonym Man Gone Missing.

Simon Kempston has performed in 35 countries across the world, and in 2019 performed more than 120 concerts across four continents, whilst in the past has performed at many major music venues and festivals including Celtic Connections, Sligo Live, Ronnie Scott's Jazz Club, Cropredy Festival and the Edinburgh Festival Fringe.

Discography
Simon Kempston
 Our Land, Their Freedom EP (2008)
 Carefree Prisoner (2009)
 Impasse (2011)
 How We Once Were (2012)
 A Fine Line (2013)
 The Last Car (2015)
 Vanishing Act (2016)
 Broken Before (2018)
 Hand On My Heart (2020)
 You Can't Win Every Time (2022)

Simon Kempston (Instrumental Acoustic Guitar)
 The Loss of an Unknown (2009)
 Estranged (2014)
 Onwards She Travels (2017)
 In Gratitude of Solitude (2020)

Man Gone Missing
 Beyond Desolate (2009)
 Burn You (2010)

References

External links
 

Living people
Scottish singer-songwriters
21st-century Scottish male singers
Scottish male guitarists
Fingerstyle guitarists
Year of birth missing (living people)
British male singer-songwriters